British Bus was a bus group in the United Kingdom. It was sold to the Cowie Group in August 1996.

History
British Bus was founded in November 1992 when the Drawlane Transport Group split its bus interests from its National Express in the lead up to the stock market listing of the latter. British Bus' owner had proposed floating the company on the stock exchange, however this was cancelled and the business sold to the Cowie Group in August 1996.

At the time of the sale British Bus owned:
Arrowline Travel
Clydeside 2000
Colchester Borough Transport
Crosville Cymru
Derby City Transport
Guildford & West Surrey Buses
Kentish Bus
Liverline Travel Services
London & Country
Londonlinks
Midland Fox
Midland Red North
Northumbria Motor Services
North Western Road Car Company
Selby & District Bus Company
Southend Transport
Stevensons of Uttoxeter
Bee Line Buzz Company
Maidstone & District Motor Services
West Riding Buses
Yorkshire Buses

References

External links

Former bus operators in England
1992 establishments in England
1996 disestablishments in England
British companies established in 1992
British companies disestablished in 1996